Pholidobolus ulisesi is a species of lizard in the family Gymnophthalmidae. It is endemic to Peru.

References

Pholidobolus
Reptiles of Peru
Endemic fauna of Peru
Reptiles described in 2016
Taxa named by Pablo J. Venegas
Taxa named by Lourdes Y. Echevarría
Taxa named by Simón E. Lobos
Taxa named by Pedro M. Sales-Nunes
Taxa named by Omar Torres-Carvajal